The Green and Yellow TV was an American pop rock band that formed in 1997 when Michael Regilio, Todd O'Keefe and Justin Rocherolle uprooted from Boston and moved to the Silver Lake neighborhood of Los Angeles, where the three met bass player Io Perry. The Green and Yellow TV played South by Southwest, CMJ, and North by North West. With the money afforded them by an Atlantic Records spec deal, the band recorded their first E.P. “Scarecrow Museum.”

After "Scarecrow Museum," The Green and Yellow TV completed their first full-length record “As Performed By." British D.J. John Peel began spinning the single “The Big Red Machine." Steven Shane McDonald, formerly of Redd Kross, stepped in on bass. The new line up recorded the single “That Says it All." Released in Europe on Falsetto Records, the song was again aired by John Peel.

When McDonald left to tour with Beck, lead singer Todd O’Keefe assumed the role of bass player. O'Keefe quit the band before the release of their final record, "Sinister Barrier" in 2006.

Discography 

 Scarecrow Museum EP (1999)
 As Performed By (2000)
 Record X (2001)
 "That Says It All" (single) (2003)
 Sinister Barrier (2006)

External links 

 Myspace Page/Official Site
 Mini-Interview: The Green and Yellow TV

1997 establishments in California
Indie rock musical groups from California
Musical groups from Los Angeles
Musical groups disestablished in 2006
Musical groups established in 1997